John F. Fernandez is an Indian politician from Karnataka. He was elected to the Upper House of the Indian Parliament, the Rajya Sabha, twice from 1987-1993 and 1993–1999. Fernandez is a member of the Indian National Congress Party.

References

Rajya Sabha members from Goa
Living people
Year of birth missing (living people)
Indian National Congress politicians from Goa
People from South Goa district